Malsaidi-ye Olya (also Romanized as Mālsa‘īdī-ye ‘Olyā) is a village in Holayjan Rural District, in the Central District of Izeh County, Khuzestan Province, Iran. At the 2006 census, its population was 94, in 22 families.

References 

Populated places in Izeh County